Tharwa Foundation  (Arabic مؤسسة ثروة) is a nonprofit, nonpartisan grassroots organization that encourages diversity, development and democracy in Syria and the broader Middle East/North Africa.  The Foundation derives its name from the Arabic word, tharwa. Founded in 2003, the Tharwa Foundation is an offshoot of the Tharwa Project, an initiative launched in Damascus Syria by Ammar Abdulhamid and Khawla Yusuf. Abdulhamid is a blogger, human rights activist and author. Yusuf is an author, politician, and human rights activist.

The Tharwa Foundation released its manifesto in early 2007. As of May 2008, it has been signed by 100 nonviolent human rights activists in the region.

Mission statement

The Tharwa Foundation was established to provide a supportive environment for democratic principles and practices in the broader Middle East and North Africa region. Through programs that encourage inter-communal dialogue and leadership development, Tharwa uses a range of educational, networking and outreach strategies to enable people of different religious, economic and ethnic backgrounds to come together to discuss peaceful solutions to the region's longstanding socio-political and development challenges.

Since its inception, Tharwa has been guided by a vision for the region’s future, based upon:

 The emergence of an open and self-empowering commonwealth of nations in the broader Middle East and North Africa region, where traditional communal identifications – ethnic, religious, and linguistic – are sources of the region's wealth and prosperity, rather than its division and decline
 Increased political awareness and issue-based, grassroots mobilization among disenfranchised groups in the region
 A growing role for local, national, and supranational non-state actors and institutions, forming the basis of vibrant civil societies where diversity is respected and celebrated
 Democratic governments that respond to the demands and needs of their citizens and address the basic developmental challenges of their countries and their growing problems of economic stagnation, political alienation, apathy and extremism
 Respect for the rights of all persons residing in the region, in accordance with the principles outlined in the United Nations Universal Declaration of Human Rights and other international conventions on human rights.

Background

History of the Tharwa Project

The Tharwa Foundation was established to continue the work of the Tharwa Project, an independent initiative launched in Syria in 2001 by activist and dissident Ammar Abdulhamid to spotlight the living conditions of religious and ethnic minorities and foster constructive dialogue between majority and minority communities in the broader Middle East and North Africa (MENA) region, in the hope of enabling the creation of new bridges of inter-communal trust and understanding, facilitating the ongoing processes of democratization and modernization and helping to stem the rising tide of extremist ideologies.

With a small paid staff, and a larger network of regular contributing reporters, Tharwa developed communication tools to enable inter-communal dialogue in the MENA region. Utilizing an interactive website, online publications, and a number of regional and international advisors and partnering institutions, such as BitterLemons, the Institute for War and Peace Reporting (IWPR), Pax Christi Nederland, Hivos, Heinrich Boell Stiftung, and openDemocracy.net, Tharwa fostered new avenues for communications and grassroots activism in the region.

However, as the Project continued to produce reports on the sensitive issues of minority rights and political reform, it attracted increased scrutiny from the government in Syria, impairing its ability to operate freely there. Eventually, Abdulhamid, himself a vocal critic of the Syrian government, was asked to leave the country. He returned to the United States on 7 September 2005.

The establishment of the Tharwa Foundation

Despite these setbacks for the Project, the Tharwa team continues to operate openly in Syria and the broader MENA region, and the number of its members, supporting partners and regular contributors is on the rise.

The Tharwa Foundation established its headquarters in the Washington, DC, area in December 2006. The Foundation currently sponsors a number of activities in the region such as the Tharwa Institute for Democratic Leadership, launched in 2007 to help train a new generation of young democracy activists. Tharwa's multimedia reports and publications are now hosted online at the Tharwa Foundation website. The US office now administers and coordinates Tharwa's programs and activities, and hopes to expand the scope of these activities over the coming years to enable the emergence of a new, diverse class of democratic leaders, empowered to represent the true aspirations of the people of the broader MENA region.

Manifesto
Tharwa's manifesto reads as follows:

Programs

The Tharwa Institute for Democratic Leadership

The Tharwa Institute for Democratic Leadership is a training initiative for emerging reformers and human rights activists from the broader Middle East and North Africa (MENA) region. The program consisted of two five-day workshops in Istanbul, and a six-month online course in Arabic addressing the key concepts of authoritarian and democratic political systems, political transitions, and advocacy campaign planning.

The Citizen Journalism Initiative

By sponsoring unaffiliated journalists, Tharwa hopes to provide an unfiltered source of news and analysis from citizens in Syria and the MENA region for regional analysts, researchers, and policymakers. The Foundation sponsors this program through hosting citizen journalists on the Syrian Elector website and the Tharwa Foundation website.

This Maryland-based non-profit acts as the mechanism to help thousands of Muslims highlight cross-culture commonalities and set aside divergent ideologies.

References

External links
 Official website
 Syrian Elector website

Further reading
 Time. "Syria In Bush’s Cross Hairs". Time. December 19, 2006.
 "Assad's Olive Branch Can Bear No Fruit". The Jewish Daily. December 29, 2006.
 "The New Revolutionaries". Bitter Lemons. February 15, 2007.
 "Syrian Dissident Launches Campaign Against Presidential Referendum in Syria". The Middle East Media Research Institute. May 22, 2007.
 "Unwanted Attention: Arab Bloggers Face Government Clampdowns". Newsweek. June 10, 2007.
 "Overcoming Extremism: new definitions, new directions". Our Voices Together Blog. October 24, 2007.
 "Democracy in Damascus". The New York Sun. December 18, 2007.

Human rights organizations based in the United States
Non-profit organizations based in Washington, D.C.
Human rights organizations based in Syria